The Bayer designations f Puppis and F Puppis are distinct and refer to two different stars in the constellation Puppus:
f Puppis (HD 61330)
F Puppis (HD 57240)

Puppis, f
Puppis